Miličević may refer to:

Branislav Miličević (born 1983), Serbian football defender who currently plays for Start
David Miličević (born 1992), Croatian handballer
Ivana Miličević (born 1974), American actress of Croatian ethnicity
Ljubo Miličević (born 1981), Australian football (soccer) player of Croatian ethnicity
Nikola Miličević (1887–1963), Croatian monk and amateur astronomer, also the eponym of:
10241 Miličević, main belt asteroid with an orbital period of 5.32 years
Paskoje Miličević Mihov (died 1516), Croatian local builder
Tomo Miličević (born 1979), lead guitarist in the L.A.-based alternative rock band 30 Seconds to Mars of Croatian ethnicity

See also
 Milićević
 Miličić

Croatian surnames
Serbian surnames